Percy Hall Grimshaw ISO FRSE FERS (1869 in Leeds – 1939 in Edinburgh) was an English entomologist and zoogeographer. He was an expert on butterflies (Lepidoptera). He is also known for his work on Diptera.

Life

He was born in Leeds the son of Emma and David Grimshaw.

He originally was in banking in Leeds.

In 1895 he accompanied William Eagle Clarke to Edinburgh to take on roles at the Royal Scottish Museum  as an entomologist. From 1930 to 1935 he was Keeper of  Natural History in the museum. He is known mainly for his work on Diptera.

In 1909 he was elected a Fellow of the Royal Society of Edinburgh. His proposers were Sir James Johnston Dobbie, John Horne, William Eagle Clarke and Ramsay Heatley Traquair.

He died in Edinburgh on 14 November 1939.

Family

He was married to Jeannie Blair White.

Works
partial list
1901 Diptera. p. l-77 Fauna Hawaiiensis and 1902 supplement with Paul Speiser
1911 Bartholomew, J.G., Clarke, W.E., Grimshaw, P.H. Atlas of Zoogeography. John Bartholomew and Co., Edinburgh.
1912 Clare Island Survey: A biological survey of Clare Island, Co. Mayo: Diptera Proceedings of the Royal Irish Academy, Vol. XXXI, Sect. 2, Part 25, pp. 1–34, December, 1912

References

Ritchie, J. 1939 [Grimshaw, P. H.]  North Western Nat., Arbroath 14 : 290–291, 247–248
Ritchie, J. 1941 [Grimshaw, P. H.]  Proc. R. Soc. Edinb., Edinburgh 60 : 392–393
Smart, J. 1945  [Grimshaw, P. H.]  Journ. Soc. Bibl. Nat. Hist., London 2 : 39–42 Bibliography of Percy Hall Grimshaw

External links
Percy Hall Grimshaw accesses full bibliography.

English entomologists
Dipterists
1869 births
1939 deaths
Companions of the Imperial Service Order
Fellows of the Royal Society of Edinburgh
Members of the Yorkshire Naturalists' Union